The Boston mayoral election of 1907 was held on Tuesday, December 10, and saw Republican nominee George A. Hibbard defeat Democratic incumbent John F. Fitzgerald as well as Independence League nominee John A. Coulthurst. Ahead of the general election, primary elections for each party had taken place on Thursday, November 14, 1907.

This was the final Boston mayoral election for a two-year term, and that was partisan in nature; a new city charter adopted in 1909 made the mayoral term four years, and made Boston municipal elections non-partisan.

Hibbard was inaugurated on Monday, January 6, 1908.

Results
Note: In October, John A. Coulthurst was selected as the Independence League candidate, and he resigned his position as secretary of the Democratic state committee. His still garnered some votes in the Democratic primary.

Democratic primary
 John A. Coulthurst, lawyer, former member of the Massachusetts House of Representatives (1902–1904)
 John F. Fitzgerald, Mayor of Boston since 1906, former member of the United States House of Representatives (1895–1901) and the Massachusetts Senate (1892–1894)

Republican primary
 Frederic W. Bliss, lawyer, former member of the Massachusetts House of Representatives (1891–1894)
 William E. Hannan, Street Commissioner, former member of the Boston Common Council (1901)
 George A. Hibbard, Postmaster of Boston since 1899, former member of the Massachusetts House of Representatives (1894–1895)

Independence League primary
 John A. Coulthurst, lawyer, former member of the Massachusetts House of Representatives (1902–1904)

General election

See also
List of mayors of Boston, Massachusetts

References

Further reading
 
 

1907
Boston
Boston mayoral
1900s in Boston